Notley Hills is a rural locality in the local government area of West Tamar in the Launceston region of Tasmania. The 2016 census determined a population of 46 for the state suburb of Notley Hills.

History
The area was originally known as Foresters Hill. Notley Hills was gazetted as a locality in 1966.

Geography
Notley Fern Gorge State Reserve is within the locality.

Road infrastructure
The C731 route (Notley Gorge Road / Notley Hills Road) runs through from south-east to north.

References

Localities of West Tamar Council
Towns in Tasmania